Xtended Play is the second album by hip hop group Frank-n-Dank. Guest appearances include Brick & Lace, Kardinal Offishall, Saukrates and Lindo P. The album contains productions from Oh No, The 2 Swift Household, Kardinal Offishall, DJ Kemo, Buddah Brothas, Tone Mason, Saukrates, P. Cauz and J Dilla.

Track listing

References

2004 albums
Frank n Dank albums
Albums produced by J Dilla
Albums produced by Kardinal Offishall
Albums produced by Saukrates
Albums produced by Tone Mason